Węglówka may refer to:

Węglówka, Lesser Poland Voivodeship, Poland
Węglówka, Subcarpathian Voivodeship, Poland